Biran Gali is a union council of Abbottabad District in Khyber-Pakhtunkhwa province of Pakistan. According to the 2017 Census of Pakistan, the population is 13,067.

Subdivisions
Andar Seri
Biran Gali
Jahafar

References

Union councils of Abbottabad District